Agrapidochori is a settlement in the West side of Elis, Peloponnese, Greece. Nativity of Mary Orthodox Church can be found in Agrapidochori settlement.

See also
List of settlements in Elis

References

External links
 Page of Agrapidochori settlement in Elis

Populated places in Elis